Pishill Woods is a  biological Site of Special Scientific Interest north of Nettlebed in Oxfordshire.

These semi-natural woods have a rich ground flora, including 35 species associated with ancient woodland. The southern part is dominated by beech and oak coppice, whereas the north, which has been managed as high forest, has mainly mature beech trees, with smaller numbers of oak, ash, cherry, whitebeam, yew and wych elm. The southern part is common land.

References

 
Sites of Special Scientific Interest in Oxfordshire